The 1954 Liège–Bastogne–Liège was the 40th edition of the Liège–Bastogne–Liège cycle race and was held on 9 May 1954. The race started and finished in Liège. The race was won by Marcel Ernzer.

General classification

References

1954
1954 in Belgian sport
1954 Challenge Desgrange-Colombo